Sheet Harbour Road is a community of the Halifax Regional Municipality in the Canadian province of Nova Scotia. It is located just five minutes south of Upper Musquodoboit, Nova Scotia. Its name is derived from Route 224, which is the primary route from the Musquodoboit Valley to Sheet Harbour, Nova Scotia.

References

External links
Explore HRM
Sheet Harbour Road

General Service Areas in Nova Scotia
Communities in Halifax, Nova Scotia